Malek Shojaee Joshoghani (born 1982) (Persian: مالک شجاعی جشوقانی) is an Iranian philosopher and assistant professor of philosophy at Institute for Humanities and Cultural Studies.
He is known for his expertise on contemporary European philosophy.
Shojaee is the editor-in-chief of Philosophy & Theology & Mysticism Quarterly Book Review.

Books
 A Philosophical-Historical Introduction to Enlightenment, Tehran: Elm, 2012

References

External links
 A Lecture by Malek Shojaee

21st-century Iranian philosophers
Continental philosophers
Philosophy academics
University of Tehran alumni
Academic staff of the Institute for Humanities and Cultural Studies
1982 births
Living people
Philosophy journal editors
Foucault scholars
Dilthey scholars